Joseph Damer (1676–1737), of Dorchester, Dorset, was an English politician.

He was a Member of Parliament (MP) for Dorchester 1722 to 1727.

References

1676 births
1737 deaths
People from Dorchester, Dorset
Members of the Parliament of Great Britain for English constituencies
Dawson-Damer family